DD-Girnar previously known as DD-10 GUJARATI is the Gujarati language channel of India's national broadcaster, Doordarshan. It is broadcast out of studios at Doordarshan Kendra (Center) in Ahmedabad in Gujarat State.

History
Doordarshan Kendra, Ahmedabad was set up on 15 March 1976, as a part of the Satellite Instructional Television Experiment SITE Project of ISRO and the 1 KW transmitter was based in PIJ, Kheda District. The studio used to function from the ISRO, Ahmedabad premises, while the administrative office was located in the Polytechnic compound in Ahmedabad.

Few years later, a plot of land was identified and a low power LPT was set up in Ahmedabad at Thaltej Tekra on 19 November 1983. The studio was commissioned on 2 October 1987 while the regional language uplinking was started on 30 December 1992. DD Metro channel was set up on 1 May 1994 while the Regional languages Satellite Channels (RLSC), DD GIRNAR 24 Hour on 1 October 1993.

List of programmes currently broadcast

 Rasoi ni Rangat (રસોઈ ની રંગત)
 Ek Dal na Pankhi (એક ડાળ ના પંખી) (re-run)
 One Minute (એક મિનિટ)
 Gram Jagat (ગ્રામ જગત)
 Filmi Sargam (ફિલ્મી સરગમ)
 Kaka ni Kamal (કાકા ની કમાલ)
 Kuvara Corporation (કુંવારા કોર્પોરેશન)
 Gammat Gulal (ગમ્મત ગુલાલ)

List of programmes formerly broadcast

Aa Mama Nu Ghar Ketle (2014-2017)
Ek Daal Na Pankhi (2015-2013)

Technology
It uses SRLS transmissions from 3pm to 8pm as it cuts DD National from the terrestrial network and the same 8pm to 3pm it runs satellite transmission.

DD Girnar's sister channels

DD Ahmadabad Metro - Hindi news program channel Gujarat and Diu Daman Island
DD Andaman and Nicobar
DD Andhra Pradesh
DD Arunachal Pradesh
DD Assam
DD Bangalore Metro - Hindi news channel Karnatak state
DD Bengla
DD Bharati
DD Bihar
DD Chandana
DD Chandigarh
DD Chennai
DD Chhattisgarh
DD Coimbatore
DD Cricket
DD Dadra and Nagar Haveli Gujarati chennal news Broadcast Gujarat and Diu and Dadra nagar and Haveli
DD Daman and Diu Gujarati chennal Broadcast Gujarat Diu & Daman and Dadra nagar Hawali
DD Delhi Metro

DD Direct+
DD English
DD Goa
DD Haryana
DD HD
DD Himachal Pradesh
DD Hyderabad Metro - Hindi news channel Teleghana state 
DD India
DD Jaipur Metro
DD Jharkhand
DD Karnataka
DD Kashir
DD Kerala
DD Kolkata Metro Hindi news channel West Bangel state
DD Kutchi
DD Lakshadweep
DD Ladakh
DD Madhya Pradesh

DD Madurai
DD Malayalam
DD Manipur
DD Marathi
DD Meghalaya
DD Mizoram
DD Mumbai Metro - Hindi news channel 
DD Nagaland
DD National
DD News
DD North-East
DD Orissa
DD Oriya
DD Panaji
DD Podhigai TV
DD Port Blair
DD Pudhucherry
DD Punjabi
DD Rajasthan

DD Sahyadri
DD Saptagiri
DD Sikkim
DD Sindhi
DD Sports
DD Tamil Nadu
DD Tripura
DD Urdu
DD Uttar Pradesh
DD Uttrakhand
DD West Bengal
DD1
DD2
Metro Gold

See also
List of programs broadcast by DD National
All India Radio
Ministry of Information and Broadcasting
DD Direct Plus
List of South Asian television channels by country

References

External links

Doordarshan news site
 An article at PFC

Doordarshan
Foreign television channels broadcasting in the United Kingdom
Television channels and stations established in 2003
Indian direct broadcast satellite services
Television stations in Ahmedabad
Gujarati-language television channels in India